The Mayor of Middlesbrough is the executive mayor of the borough of Middlesbrough in North Yorkshire, England. The incumbent since 2019 is Andy Preston.

Referendums

2001

2013

Election results

2002

2007

2011

2015

2019

References

Middlesbrough